Biblical and Talmudic units of measurement were used primarily by ancient Israelites and appear frequently within the Hebrew Bible as well as in later rabbinic writings, such as the Mishnah and Talmud. These units of measurement continue to be used in functions regulating Jewish contemporary life. The specificity of some of the units used and which are encompassed under these systems of measurement (whether in linear distance, weight or volume of capacity) have given rise, in some instances, to disputes, owing to the discontinuation of their Hebrew names and their replacement by other names in modern usage.

Note: The listed measurements of this system range from the lowest to highest   acceptable halakhic value, in terms of conversion to and from contemporary systems of measurement.

Contemporary unit conversion 

While documentation on each unit's relation to another's is plentiful, there is much debate, both within Judaism and in academia, about the exact relationship between measurements in the system and those in other measurement systems. Classical definitions, such as that an etzba was seven barleycorns laid side by side, or that a log was equal to six medium-sized eggs, are also open to debate.
Nevertheless, the entire system of measurement bears profound resemblance to the Babylonian and the ancient Egyptian systems, and is currently understood to have likely been derived from some combination of the two. Scholars commonly infer the absolute sizes based on the better-known Babylonian units' relations to their contemporary counterparts.

Length and distance 
The original measures of length were clearly derived from the human body — the finger, hand, arm, span, foot, and pace — but since these measures differ between individuals, they are reduced to a certain standard for general use. The Israelite system thus used divisions of the digit or fingerbreadth (Hebrew: אצבע, etzba; plural etzba'ot), the palm or handbreadth (Hebrew: טפח, ; plural /), which is equal to four fingerbreadths, the span (Hebrew: זרת), the ell or cubit (Hebrew: אמה, Amah, plural Amot), the mile (Hebrew: מיל, mil; plural milim), and the parsa (Hebrew: פרסה, parasa). The latter two are loan words into the Hebrew language, and borrowed measurements - the Latin mille, and Iranian parasang, respectively; both were units of itinerant distance, and thus varied according to terrain and stride length, and, in the case of the parasang, also on the speed of travel.

The Israelite measurements were related as follows:
 1 palm [handbreadth] = 4 digit (etzba'ot)
 1 span = 3 palms
 1 ell [cubit] = 2 spans, or 6 palms [handbreadths]
 1 mil = 2000 ells [cubits]
 1 parasang = 4 mils

Discrepancies of ell 

The biblical ell is closely related to the cubit, but two different factors are given in the Bible; Ezekiel's measurements imply that the ell was equal to 1 cubit plus 1 palm (Tefah), while elsewhere in the Bible, the ell is equated with 1 cubit exactly. Ezekiel's ell, by which he gave measurements in his guided vision through a future Jerusalem Temple, is thus one sixth larger than the standard ell, for which an explanation seems to be suggested by the Book of Chronicles; the Chronicler writes that Solomon's Temple was built according to "cubits following the first measure", suggesting that over the course of time the original ell was supplanted by a smaller one. The Egyptians also used two different ells, one of which — the royal ell — was a sixth larger than the common ell; this royal measurement was the earlier of the two in Egyptian use, and the one which the Pyramids of the 3rd and 4th Dynasties seem to be measured in integer multiples of.

The smaller of the Egyptian ells measured , but the standard Babylonian ell, cast in stone on one of the statues of King Gudea, was 49.5 cm (19.49 in), and the larger Egyptian ell was between 52.5 and 52.8 cm (20.67 and 20.79 in). The Books of Samuel portray the Temple as having a Phoenician architect, and in Phoenicia it was the Babylonian ell which was used to measure the size of parts of ships. Thus scholars are uncertain whether the standard Biblical ell would have been 49.5 or 52.5 cm (19.49 or 20.67 in), but are fairly certain that it was one of these two figures. From these figures for the size of a Biblical ell, that of the basic unit — the finger-breadth (Etzba) — can be calculated to be either 2.1 or 2.2 cm (0.83 or 0.87 in); Rav Avraham Chaim Naeh approximates at 2 cm (0.79 in); Talmudic scholar Chazon Ish at 2.38 cm (0.94 in). The mile (Mil) is thus about 963 or 1146 meters (3160 or 3760 ft) — approximately six or seven tenths of a mile, and significantly shorter than the modern statute or land mile of 5280 ft or 1760 yd (approximately 1.6 km).

The precise width of the etzba (finger) has been a subject of controversy among halakhic authorities. The best known are those of the Rav Chayim No'eh and Chazon Ish.

This affects the other measurements in the following ways:  2.99–3.02 in (7.59–7.67 cm);  8.98–9.07 in (22.81–23.03 cm);  17.95–18.14 in (45.59–46.08 cm).

Talmudic additions
The stadium appears to have been adopted from Persia, while the double palm seems to have been derived from the Greek .
The relationship between four of these additional units and the earlier system is as follows:
 1 double palm = 2 palms
 1 pace = 1 ell
 1 stadium = 1600 palms ( mile).  Others say that 1 stadium was equivalent to 470–500 cubits.
 1 day's journey (derekh yom) = 10 parasangs (parasa)

The other two additional units are more ambiguous. The garmida is mentioned repeatedly but without its size being indicated; it is even sometimes treated as an area, and as a volume. The cord is given two different definitions; in the Mishnah it is 50 ells, but in the Gemara it is only 4 ells.

Area
The Israelite system of measuring area was fairly informal; the biblical text merely measures areas by describing how much land could be sown with a certain volume measure of seed, for example the amount of land able to be sown with 2 seahs of barley. The closest thing to a formal area unit was the yoke (sometimes translated as acre), which referred to the amount of land that a pair of yoked oxen could plough in a single day; in Mesopotamia the standard estimate for this was 6,480 square cubits, which is roughly equal to a third of an acre.

"Searah" - (pl. ) hair, square  of a 

"Adashah" - (pl. ) lentils,  of a 

"Geris" - (pl. ) hulled fava bean, a circle with a diameter of about 2 centimeters (0.8 in)

"Amah al amah" - (pl. ) square cubit 0.232 to 0.328 m2  (2.50-3.53 ft2)

"Beit rova" - (pl. ) space of 10.5 cubits x 10.5 cubits for sowing  of a kav. Area varies between 24 to 34.5 m2 (258–372 ft2)

"Beit seah" - (pl. ) space for sowing a  576 to 829.5 m2 (689-992 yd2)

Volume
The Israelite system of powder/liquid volume measurements corresponds exactly with the Babylonian system. Unlike the Egyptian system, which has units for multiples of 1, 10, 20, 40, 80, and 160 of the base unit, the Babylonian system is founded on multiples of 6 and 10, namely units of 1, 12, 24, 60, 72 (60 plus 12), 120, and 720. The basic unit was the mina, which was defined as 1 sixtieth of a maris, which itself was the quantity of water equal in weight to a light royal talent; the maris was thus equal to about 30.3 litres, and hence the mina is equal to about 0.505 litres. In the Israelite system, the term log is used in place of the Babylonian mina but the measurement is otherwise the same.

Although they both use the log as the basic unit, the Israelites differentiated their systems of volume measure between dry and liquid states.

Dry measure
For dry measurement, or what is simply a measure of capacity rather than of weight, the smallest unit of which is the beitza (egg), followed by the log (לג), (followed by the kab (קב), followed by the se'ah (סאה), followed by the ephah (איפה), followed by the lethek (לתך), and finally by the kor (כור). The lethek is mentioned only once in the Masoretic Text, and the Septuagint translates it by the Greek term nebeloinou, meaning wine-skin. These measurements were related as follows:
 1½ eggs = Quarter of a log (also used for a cup of wine)
 6 eggs (beitza) = 1 log
 4 log (24 eggs) = 1 kab
 6 kab (144 eggs) = 1 se'ah
 3 se'ah (432 eggs) = 1 ephah
 5 ephah = 1 lethek
 2 lethek = 1 kor

The kezayit is, by different sources, considered equal to  a beitza,  of a beitza, or not directly related to the other units of volume.

The omer, which the Torah mentions as being equal to one-tenth of an ephah, is equivalent to the capacity of 43.2 eggs, or what is also known as one-tenth of three seahs. In dry weight, the omer weighed between 1.560 kg to 1.770 kg, being the quantity of flour required to separate therefrom the dough offering. In the Torah, it is the Priestly Code which refers to the omer, rather than to the se'ah or kab; textual scholars view the Priestly Code as one of the later sources of the Torah, dating from a period when Egypt and Assyria had much more direct influence over Israel.

According to Ezekiel 45:11 both the eipha and the bath were one tenth an homer (חומר HOMeR, not be confused with the omer). Boadt notes the word homer comes from the Hebrew for an "ass."  "It is one ass-load."

Liquid measure
For liquid measure, the main units were the Log, Hin, and Bath, related as follows:
 1 Log =   4 Revi'ith
 1 Hin =  12 Logs
 1 Bath = 6 Hin

The Bath, equal to 72 Logs, is thus the liquid equivalent of the Ephah, also equal to 72 Logs. The liquid equivalent of the omer, which appears without a special name, only being described as the tenth part of a bath, is as much of an awkward fit as the omer itself, and is only mentioned by Ezekiel and the Priestly Code; scholars attribute the same explanation to it as with the Omer — that it arose as a result of decimalisation. The Omer is mentioned as a tenth of an ephah in Exodus 16:36, before the Priestly code.

According to Herbert G. May, chief editor of two classic Bible-related reference books, the bath may be archaeologically determined to have been about 22 liters (5.75 US gal) from a study of jar remains marked 'bath' and 'royal bath' from Tell Beit Mirsim.
Based on this, a Revi'ith would measure (approx.) 76 ml. Or 2.7 fluid oz.

Talmudic additions
In Talmudic times many more measures of capacity were used, mostly of foreign origin, especially from Persia and Greece, which had both held dominance over Judea by the time the Talmud came to be created. The definitions for many of these are disputed. Some dry measures were used for liquids as well, e.g. se'eh. The  (קורטוב) was used for very small amounts (1/64 of a log).

Mass and money

The Babylonian system, which the Israelites followed, measured weight with units of the talent, mina, shekel (Hebrew: שקל), and giru, related to one another as follows:
 1 shekel = 24  giru
 1 mina = 60 shekels (later 100 zuz)
 1 talent = 60 mina

In the Israelite system, the ratio of the giru to the shekel was altered, and the talent, mina, and giru, later went by the names kikkar (ככר), litra, and gerah (גרה), respectively; litra being the Greek form of the Latin libra, meaning pound.
The Israelite system was thus as follows:

 1 shekel = 20 gerah
 1 litra = 60 shekels
 1 kikkar = 60 litra

There were, however, different versions of the talent/kikkar in use; a royal and a common version. In addition, each of these forms had a heavy and a light version, with the heavy version being exactly twice the weight of the lighter form; the light royal talent was often represented in the form of a duck, while the heavy royal talent often took the form of a lion. The mina for the heavy royal talent weighed 1.01 kilograms (2.23 lbs), while that for the heavy common talent weighed only 984 grams (2.17 lbs); accordingly, the heavy common shekel would be about 15.87 grams (0.56 oz). According to Josephus, it was the heavy common talent, and its mina and shekel, that was the normal measure of weight in Syria and Judea; Josephus also mentions an additional unit – the bekah – which was exactly half a shekel.

Gradually, the system was reformed, perhaps under the influence of Egypt, so that a mina was worth only 50 shekels rather than 60; to achieve this, the shekel remained the same weight, while the weight of the standard mina was reduced. Moses mandated that the standard coinage would be in single shekels of silver; thus each shekel coin would constitute about 15.86 grams (0.51 troy ounces) of pure silver. In Judea, the Biblical shekel was initially worth about 3⅓ denarii, but over time the measurement had enlarged so that it would be worth exactly four denarii.

"Pruta" (pl. ) - a copper coin (Hebrew פרוטה prutah) - 22 mg (0.34 troy grains)
"Issar" (pl. ) - a Roman copper coin (As) - 177 mg (2.732 troy grains)
"Pundion" (pl. ) - a Roman copper coin (Dupondius) - 349 mg (5.4 troy grains)
"Ma'ah" (pl.  = "money") -  a silver coin, (Hebrew gerah) - 699 mg (10.8 troy grains)
In Hebrew it is called a Gerah (as in twenty gerah is a Shekel, Exodus); (litt. grain; also gram derives from it).

"Dinar" (pl. Dinarim) - a Roman silver coin (Denarius (pl. denarii, (Hebrew Zuz, pl. zuzim) -  4.26 grams (0.137 ozt)
In Hebrew, a silver Dinar was called a "Zuz" to avoid confusion with the gold Dinar.

"Shekel" (pl. shkalim) - a Jewish silver coin (Shekel, (Hebrew שקל) - 14 g
Moses instituted it as the standard coinage. From 8.39 to 15.86 grams (0.27-0.51 troy ounces) of pure silver (Chazon Ish).

"Pim" - a weight discovered by archaeologists in the form of the pim weight. About 7.6 grams, or  shekel.
"Sela" (pl. selo'im) - a silver coin (tetradrachm) - 17.1 grams (0.55 ozt) (a sela equals two shekel).

 Dinar (pl.  or ) - a Roman gold coin (Aureus) (Hebrew "Dinerei zahav") - 7.99 grams (0.257 ozt) of gold (106.25 grams or 3.416 ozt in silver)
 "Minah" (pl. ) - a silver coin - 424.87 grams (13.66 ozt) - equivalent with maneh which is 100 zuzim.
 "Kikar" (pl. kikarim) - as a gold weight, equivalent to a talent of gold - 3000 shekel

Time

Year 

The Hebrew calendar is a lunar calendar synchronised with the seasons by intercalation, i.e. a lunisolar calendar. There are thus 12 ordinary months plus an extra month that is added in (intercalated) every few years. Some months vary in length by a day, as well. The months originally had very descriptive names, such as Ziv (meaning light) and Ethanim (meaning strong, perhaps in the sense of strong rain - i.e. monsoon), with Canaanite origins, but after the Babylonian captivity, the names were changed to the ones used by the Babylonians. With the Babylonian naming, the intercalary month has no special name of its own, and is merely referred to as Adar I, the following month being Adar/Adar II (in the Babylonian calendar, it was Adar II that was considered to be the intercalary month).

Week 
The Israelite month was clearly broken up into weeks, since the Genesis creation (and biblical references to Shabbat) describe a seven-day week.

The modern Hebrew calendar follows a seven-day weekly cycle, which runs concurrently but independently of the monthly and annual cycles. The origin of Hebrew seven day week and the Sabbath, as well as the true meaning of the name, is uncertain. The earliest Biblical passages which mention it (Exodus 20:10 and 24:21; Deut. 5:14; Amos 8:5) presuppose its previous existence, and analysis of all the references to it in the canon makes it plain that its observance was neither general nor altogether spontaneous in either pre-exilic or post-exilic Israel. It was probably originally connected in some manner with the cult of the moon, as indeed is suggested by the frequent mention of Sabbath and New-Moon festivals in the same sentence (Isa. 1:13; Amos 8:5; H Kings 6:23).

The names for the days of the week are simply the day number within the week. In Hebrew, these names may be abbreviated using the numerical value of the Hebrew letters, for example "Day 1, or Yom Rishon".

Day 
In addition to "tomorrow" and "yesterday", the Israelite vocabulary also contained a distinct word for two days ago. In the Bible, the day is divided up vaguely, with descriptions such as midnight, and half-night. Nevertheless, it is clear that the day was considered to start at dusk.

By Talmudic times, the Babylonian system of dividing up the day (from sunset to sunrise, and sunrise to sunset), into hours (Hebrew: שעה, sha'ah), parts (Hebrew: חלק, heleq, plural halaqim), and moments (Hebrew: רגע, rega, plural rega'im), had been adopted; the relationship of these units was:

 1 part  (heleq) = 76 moments  (rega'im) (each moment, rega, is 0.04386 of a second; 22.8 rega'im is 1 second)
 1 hour (sha'ah) = 1080 parts (halaqim) (each heleq is 3⅓ seconds)
 1 day = 24 hours (sha'ah)

To complicate matters, Halakha, speaking of the relative hour, states that there are always 12 hours between the break of dawn and sunset, so these measurements are averages. For example, in the summer, a day time hour is much longer than a night time hour.

See also
 Bible code, a purported set of secret messages encoded within the Torah.
 Chol HaMoed, the intermediate days during Passover and Sukkot.
 Chronology of the Bible
 Counting of the Omer
 Gematria, Jewish system of assigning numerical value to a word or phrase.
 Hebrew calendar
 Hebrew numerals
 Jewish and Israeli holidays 2000–2050
 Lag BaOmer, 33rd day of counting the Omer.
 Notarikon, a method of deriving a word by using each of its initial letters.
 Sephirot, the 10 attributes/emanations found in Kabbalah.
 Significance of numbers in Judaism
 Weekly Torah portion, division of the Torah into 54 portions.

References

Citations

Bibliography

.

Further reading

External links
 TorahCalc: Biblical and Talmudic Measurement Converter
 Ka-Zait
 Summary table of Biblical & Talmudic units of measurement by Ronnie Figdor
 Oxford Biblical Studies Online: Weights and Measures

Hebrew
Hebrew Bible topics
Torah
Talmud
Jewish law
Systems of units
Religion in ancient Israel and Judah
Ancient Israel and Judah